Lubicon Lake may refer to:

 Lubicon Lake Band, a federally recognized band government
 Lubicon Lake Indian Nation, a federally unrecognized traditional government